Myrmekiaphila comstocki is a spider in the family Euctenizidae ("wafer-lid trapdoor spiders"), in the infraorder Mygalomorphae ("mygalomorphs").
The distribution range of Myrmekiaphila comstocki includes the USA and Mexico.

References

External links
NCBI Taxonomy Browser, Myrmekiaphila comstocki

Euctenizidae
Spiders described in 1926